Santilly may refer to:

Santilly, Eure-et-Loir, a commune in the French region of Centre
Santilly, Saône-et-Loire, a commune in the French region of Bourgogne
 Ray Santilli, British film producer, known for his exploitation in 1995 of the controversial "alien autopsy" footage.